Wila Jaqhi Wila Jaqhi (Aymara wila blood, blood-red, jaqhi precipice, cliff, "red cliff", also spelled Huila Acce, Huila Aje, Huila Jakke, Vela Aje, Wila Jakke) may refer to:

 Wila Jaqhi, a mountain in the Cusco Region, Peru
 Wila Jaqhi (Bolivia), a mountain in the Tapacarí Province, Cochabamba Department, Bolivia
 Wila Jaqhi (Punata), a mountain in the Punata Province, Cochabamba Department, Bolivia